Black Holes and Revelations is the fourth studio album by English rock band Muse, first released on 3 July 2006 through Warner Bros. Records and Muse's Helium-3 imprint. It was recorded over four months with producer Rich Costey in New York City, London, Milan, and southern France. It saw a change in style for Muse, with influences including Depeche Mode, Millionaire, Lightning Bolt, Sly and the Family Stone, and music from southern Italy. Like their previous albums, it features political and dystopian undertones, with lyrics covering topics such as political corruption, alien invasion, revolution and New World Order conspiracies, as well as more conventional love songs.

Black Holes and Revelations received positive reviews and appeared on many year-end lists. It received a Mercury Prize nomination and later appeared in the 2007 version of 1001 Albums You Must Hear Before You Die. The album entered the charts at number one in five countries, including the United Kingdom, and in the top 10 in several other countries. It was later certified triple platinum in the UK and platinum in the US. Singles "Supermassive Black Hole" and "Knights of Cydonia" were both UK top-10 hits, while "Starlight", "Map of the Problematique", and "Invincible" all charted within the top 25. , Black Holes and Revelations has sold more than 4.5 million copies worldwide.

Recording 
Muse's third album, Absolution (2003), brought them mainstream exposure in the United States. Muse began writing and rehearsing for their next album at Studio Miraval, an old château in southern France. Absolution producer Rich Costey joined them two weeks later.

Songwriter Matt Bellamy said the band wanted to be free from distractions so that they could "concentrate, spend time and be surrounded by different musical influences". However, progress was slow and they had difficulty deciding which songs to work on. More work was completed in New York City at Avatar Studios and Electric Lady Studios in New York, and at a studio in Italy.

Bassist Chris Wolstenholme said writing and recording was more relaxed than previous albums, as the band had no deadline. Costey wanted to capture Bellamy's "personality" as a guitarist, recording the sound of his fingers and plectrum on the strings. Muse took a more active role in using studio technology, having previously left its use to engineers.

With "Take a Bow", Muse wanted to blend classical, electronic and rock music. It opens with string arpeggios inspired by Philip Glass, backed by a Moog synthesizer. The "Map of the Problematique" riff was written on keyboard; at Costey's encouragement, Bellamy recreated it on guitar by splitting the guitar signal into three audio signals, which were processed with pitch shifters and synthesisers. "Assassin", influenced by the noise rock band Lightning Bolt, began as a long progressive rock song with a "huge" piano break before Muse trimmed it.

"Soldier's Poem" was "unlike anything [Muse had] ever done before". It was written for Absolution, but rewritten for Black Holes with new lyrics and an arrangement inspired by "Can't Help Falling in Love" by Elvis Presley. Drummer Dominic Howard said the band had planned to record it with a "massive, epic" approach, but decided to use a small studio with vintage equipment and few microphones. Howard described it as a "real highlight", with "some of the most amazing vocals I've ever heard Matt do".

"Knights of Cydonia" was inspired by surf rock and the 1962 single "Telstar" by the Tornados, which featured Bellamy's father George Bellamy. Bellamy said that the song title "acknowledged that this is a bit funny, particularly when we are pushing the epic side of the band to almost comical levels ... There's a lot of freedom in being able to laugh at yourself."

Themes 
Black Holes and Revelations has been described as featuring progressive rock and space rock, and was said by some reviewers to carry a political message. The album begins with the track "Take a Bow", which is an "attack on an all but unnamed political leader", incorporating lyrics such as "Corrupt, you corrupt and bring corruption to all that you touch". These themes are carried through the album in the tracks "Exo-Politics" and "Assassin".

The album touches on controversial subject matters, such as "The New World Order conspiracy, unjustifiable war, abusive power, conspiratorial manipulation and populist revolt," and is influenced by the conspiracy theories that the band are interested in. Bellamy said he finds "the unknown in general a stimulating area for the imagination", and this interest is reflected throughout the album, which features rebellious paranoia (particularly during "Assassin"). The album also includes more emotional themes, including regret, ambition, and love.

The title is taken from lyrics in "Starlight". Bellamy told Q: "Black holes and revelations – they're the two areas of songwriting for me that make up the majority of this album. A revelation about yourself, something personal, something genuine of an everyday nature that maybe people can relate to. Then the black holes are these songs that are from the more ... unknown regions of the imagination."

Artwork
The album artwork was photographed in Bardenas and designed by Storm Thorgerson. The motif was inspired by the "galloping" of "Knights of Cydonia" and "Invincible", an allusion to the Four Horsemen of the Apocalypse.

Release 
Black Holes and Revelations was released on 3 July 2006 in the UK, followed by releases in the US, Australia, Taiwan and Japan. It was also available as a limited edition CD/DVD combination, that featured videos and live renditions of "Supermassive Black Hole", "Knights of Cydonia" and "Starlight". In addition, the album was re-released in the US on vinyl LP on 18 August 2009. The album was certified double platinum in the UK on 22 December 2006 and triple platinum on 6 December 2010. Singles were released in both the UK and the US, though they were released in different orders in each country. All singles excepting "Map of the Problematique" were available on vinyl LP, CD, DVD (containing the music video for the single) and as a download.

In the UK, the first single was "Supermassive Black Hole", released on 12 June 2006. It reached number four on the UK Singles Chart, making it the highest-charting single in the UK for the band to date. It was followed by "Starlight", "Knights of Cydonia", "Invincible" and "Map of the Problematique"; "Knights of Cydonia" was the only one to reach the top ten. The album stayed at number one for two weeks on the UK Albums Chart, producing Muse's largest sales up to that point.

The first US single was "Knights of Cydonia", on 13 June 2006, which peaked at number 10 on the Billboard Modern Rock Tracks chart, and was followed by "Starlight" and "Supermassive Black Hole". "Starlight" was Muse's most popular single in the US at that point, reaching number two on the Modern Rock Tracks chart. The album debuted at number nine on the Billboard 200, making it Muse's first top-ten entry in the US.

Reception

Critical

Black Holes and Revelations was met with positive reviews from critics. Metacritic, which assigns a normalised rating based on a range of reviews from mainstream critics, aggregated the album's average review score to 75 out of 100, based on 32 reviews. The album received top ratings from Observer Music Monthly, Q, E! Online, and Alternative Press.

Planet Sound named Black Holes and Revelations their "Album of the Year", and the album was placed third in the NMEs "Albums of the Year" list. as well as being named Q's second-best album of the year. The album also received a Mercury Prize nomination, and was featured in the updated 2007 version of the book 1001 Albums You Must Hear Before You Die. The album was named as one of  Classic Rocks ten essential progressive rock albums of the decade.

In contrast, several critics called the album "overblown", including RTÉ's Bill Lehane, the NMEs Anthony Thornton, and Rolling Stone's Christian Hoard. Hoard went on to describe "Knights of Cydonia" and "City of Delusion" as "ridiculous", but concluded that it was "surprising" that the album worked. The A.V. Clubs Noel Murray, on the other hand, gave the band credit for reworking themselves, but called the album a "nightmare" and gave it a D+. The album also garnered some crossover appeal, with Oakland hip hop group Zion I releasing a notable remix of "Knights of Cydonia" in 2008.

Accolades
Black Holes and Revelations was placed at number 34 in a public vote conducted by Q for "The Best British Albums of all time" in February 2008. The album also spawned "Supermassive Black Hole", Muse's most successful single in the UK to date, hitting number four on the charts. In October 2011, NME placed it at number 74 on its list "150 Best Tracks of the Past 15 Years". It was nominated for the Kerrang! Award for Best Single. The album was ranked at 14th in the RadioX UK magazine best albums of 2006. The album was ranked at number three on NMEs list of the albums of the year in 2006. On 26 January 2008, "Knights of Cydonia" was announced as the number-one song on Australia's 2007 Triple J Hottest 100. The song was also ranked No. 18 in the Triple J Hottest 100 of All Time, 2009. It was also ranked No. 53 on Rhapsody's list of the Top 100 Tracks of the Decade. In October 2011, NME placed it at number 44 on its list "150 Best Tracks of the Past 15 Years".

Commercial
Black Holes and Revelations sold 115,144 copies in its first week in the UK, more than the first week sales of Muse's previous album, Absolution. It was certified triple platinum by the BPI, and has sold more than one million copies in the UK .

Five singles were released in the UK, of which three were released in the US. A world tour followed the release of the album that included dates in the UK, the US, Canada, Australia and most of Europe and Asia.

Tour 

In July 2006, Muse announced they would embark on their "biggest ever tour" in support of the album. The first shows included the Leeds and Reading Carling Weekend festivals, followed by a tour that visited most of the world's major continents. The tour saw them travelling around most of the world, and its shows became noted for their increasing usage of special effects. Some dates that were booked to play in support of My Chemical Romance in the US were cancelled after members of both bands were affected by food poisoning. The US stretch of the tour included dates at Madison Square Garden and a headlining slot at Lollapalooza.

Between the European arena and festival/stadium tours, the band embarked on a tour to Australia and Asia. The band were second on the bill at the 2007 Big Day Out Festival, behind headliners Tool. They also played sideshows in Sydney and Melbourne before embarking on concerts in South East Asia. That tour led to the band's biggest tour of Japan and a debut show in South Korea. The band then moved to America, playing their biggest North American headline concerts at the time at the Inglewood Forum and the Palacio de los Deportes arena in Mexico City.

The biggest concert of the tour was the two nights they played at the new Wembley Stadium on 16 and 17 June 2007, which incorporated much more extensive special effects than other concerts. Footage of the latter concert was released on DVD, while a live CD album contained a selection of recorded tracks from the two nights. Both discs were released as a joint package under the title HAARP. After Wembley, the tour continued with Muse playing many gigs on European festival circuits, including headline appearances at Rock Werchter and the Benicàssim Festival. The tour then progressed to Muse's biggest North American tour at that point, including appearances at New York City's Madison Square Garden, Morrison's Red Rocks Amphitheatre and a headline appearance at Lollapalooza 2007. The band toured Eastern Europe in October before heading for an arena tour of Australia in November, finally ending at the KROQ Almost Acoustic Christmas. The following year saw Muse have a much more relaxed schedule, but still saw them play their first gigs in Dubai and South Africa at festivals, before making their gig debuts in South America on a three-week arena tour.

Track listing 

A longer version of "Assassin", dubbed the "Grand Omega Bosses Version" was also released on the "Knights of Cydonia" vinyl single.

Personnel 
Muse
 Matthew Bellamy – lead vocals, lead and rhythm guitars, piano, synthesizers, production
 Christopher Wolstenholme – bass, backing vocals, double bass on "Soldier's Poem", additional synthesizers on "Map of the Problematique" and "Hoodoo", production
 Dominic Howard – drums, percussion, brief vocals and electronic drums on "Supermassive Black Hole", Buchla 200e on "Take a Bow", production

Additional personnel

 Edoardo de Angelis – first violin on "Take a Bow", "City of Delusion", "Hoodoo" and "Knights of Cydonia"
 Around Art – strings on "Take a Bow", "City of Delusion", "Hoodoo" and "Knights of Cydonia"
 Marco Brioschi – trumpet on "City of Delusion" and "Knights of Cydonia"
 Tommaso Colliva – engineer
 Myriam Correge – assistant engineer
 Rich Costey – production
 Max Dingle – mixing assistant
 Tom Kirk – antique items crushed on "Exo-Politics" 
 Roger Lian – mastering assistant
 Vlado Meller – mastering
 Mauro Pagani – string arrangements, string conductor
 Ross Petersen – assistant engineer
 Audrey Riley – string arrangements, string conductor
 Mark Rinaldi – mixing assistant
 Ryan Simms – assistant engineer
 Derrick Santini – photography
 Storm Thorgerson – cover photo
 Rupert Truman – cover photo
 Howie Weinberg – mastering

Charts

Weekly charts

Year-end charts

Certifications

Single releases

References

External links 
 Muse.mu – Official website
 Black Holes and Revelations at Metacritic

Muse (band) albums
2006 albums
Albums with cover art by Storm Thorgerson
Warner Records albums
Albums recorded at Electric Lady Studios
Progressive rock albums by British artists
Alternative rock albums by British artists